UMAP may refer to:
Military Units to Aid Production
University Mobility in Asia and the Pacific
Uniform Manifold Approximation and Projection